Francisco Hudson Cárdenas (July 1, 1826 in Curaco de Vélez, Chile – March, 1859) was a Chilean naval officer and hydrographer notable for his explorations of Southern Chile and Chilean Patagonia. Hudson sailed on behalf of the Chilean government several times to Peru and Ecuador, assisted the German immigrants arrive to Valdivia but gained notoriety for his explorations and investigations of Maullín River, Roca Remolino and the channels of Aysén Region. Hudson was interested in investigating the possible existence of a sailing route through internal waters from the Chiloé Archipelago to the Straits of Magellan, but came to realize that the Isthmus of Ofqui made this impossible. However his hydrographic works laid the groundwork for Hans Steffen's exploration of Aysén Region in late 19th century.

Biography
Hudson was born in the town of Curaco de Vélez in Quinchao Island of Chiloé Archipelago to the couple Santiago (possibly a translation of "James") Hudson and Juana Cárdenas. Hudson studied at the Maritime School of Ancud (Escuela Naútica de Ancud), afterwards he was transferred to the frigate Chile where Roberto Simpson was in command. He later explored Maullín River with Francisco Vidal Gormaz but did however not reach Llanquihue Lake, its birthplace. Hudson and Vidal Gormaz reached only to a point he observed "three cascades" in the river. Gormaz proposed to clean the river from trunks to use it for transport of wood in benefit of the German settlers that had already settled in the shores of Llanquihue Lake. Hudson tried later unsuccessfully to reach the "three cascades" starting from Llanquihue Lake, and was preparing a new expedition when he was ordered instead to investigate Roca Remolino (lit. "whirl rock"), a dangerous underwater rock in Chacao Channel.

After having read "Sailing Directions for South America" by Robert FitzRoy Francisco Hudson realized the possibility of the existence of a route that would allow traffic through the channels of Patagonia without the need of sailing through the open sea at Tres Montes Peninsula. Sailing at the open sea in the roaring 40s was dangerous and finding such route would significantly improve the traffic between the Chilean settlement of Punta Arenas in the Straits of Magellan on one hand and Chiloé and Central Chile on the other.

In 1857 he is sent to explore the possible inner passage he had inferred from Fitz Roy's writings. He sailed off Ancud with the brigantine Janaqueo and the sloop-of-war Emprendedora but had to send back Janaqueo due to its bad maintenance after many years of service. The expedition sailed thought Moraleda Channel to San Rafael Lagoon where they explored by foot the Isthmus of Ofqui without finding any passage to the San Quintín Bay of Gulf of Penas. In this explorations he was accompanied by young German immigrant Francisco Fonck.

After this expedition he mapped Dalcahue Channel near his hometown and explored once again Maullín River with Vidal Gormaz.

Death
In 1858 he was put in command of the brigantine Pizarro and sailed south from Valparaíso with the governor of Punta Arenas on board. In Punta Arenas he met his brother-in-law Martín Aguayo who was in command of the brigantine Meteoro and had like Hudson to sail north, so they decided to sail together. They then tried to sail through the western section of the Strait of Magellan but  decided instead, due to the strong winds, to sail first eastwards and to enter the Pacific through Cape Horn. After having passed the Le Maire Strait the two ships separated in a storm and while the more robust Meteoro managed to sail back to Punta Arenas for reparations, Pizarro and Francisco Hudson were never seen again. On July 1, 1860, the government issued a decree where he was declared dead.

Legacy
Francisco Hudson contributed substantially to the exploration and mapping of southern Chile, improving navigation around Chiloé Archipelago and in the Patagonian channels through his maps. His works were essential for the later inland exploration of Aysén Region by Hans Steffen. Hudson did also outline several projects to improve fluvial and maritime traffic but most of them were never applied. Francisco Hudson had Mount Hudson, the most active volcano of Aysén Region is named after him as well as one of several headlands in at the entrance of San Rafael Lagoon and the Oceanographic and Hydrographic service of the Chilean Navy have one of its buildings named "Don Francisco Hudson".

Sources
Sepúlveda, Jorge. Francisco Hudson, un destacado marino poco conocido en nuestra historia, Revista de Marina.

19th-century Chilean Navy personnel
19th-century explorers
Chilean Navy officers
Chilean hydrographers
Chilean explorers
Explorers of Chile
1826 births
1859 deaths
People lost at sea
People from Chiloé Province
Chilean people of English descent